Alfred Barnes may refer to:

 Alfred Barnes (Labour politician) (1887–1974), British Labour Party MP and government minister
 Alfred Barnes (Derbyshire politician) (1823–1901), British Liberal and later Liberal Unionist politician, MP 1880–1892
 Alfred Smith Barnes (1817–1888), American publisher
 Alfred E. Barnes (1892–1960), architect from Kansas City, Missouri